Ujazd  is a village in the administrative district of Gmina Trzciana, within Bochnia County, Lesser Poland Voivodeship, in southern Poland.

The village has a population of 340.

References

Ujazd